The Eddie series  is a book series written by  Viveca Lärn (earlier Viveca Sundvall) about Eddie, a boy in early primary school. The books were originally published between 1991 and 2001, and make up a spin-off series set in the Mimmi universe. The books are told from a third-person perspective and the main character, Eddie, is the brother of Mimmi's friend Anders. Eddie's father is an alcoholic when the stories begin.

In 1994, a television series based on the books and named Håll huvudet kallt was produced. It aired as Sveriges Television's Christmas calendar that year.

Books

References

Spin-offs
 
Swedish children's book series
Book series introduced in 1991